Miss Universo Chile 2017, the 54th Miss Universo Chile pageant, was held on October 19, 2017. Catalina Cáceres crowned Natividad Leiva as her successor at the end of the event. Leiva will represent Chile at Miss Universe 2017 pageant. Valentina Schnitzer was 1st runner-up and Ingrid Aceitón was 2nd runner-up.

Final results

Delegates
The 15 official delegates were selected on two castings.

Judges
 Marlen Olivarí
 Andrés Caniulef
 Pato Moreno

Notes
 Valentina Schnitzer won the Miss Supranational Chile 2015 pageant and also participated in Reina Hispanoamericana 2017.
 Natividad Leiva won Miss Earth Chile 2015 pageant and finished as Top 8 in Miss Earth 2015. Also, she participated on Miss United Continents 2016 pageant in Guayaquil, Ecuador.
 Ingrid Aceitón was a delegate of the Miss World Chile 2012 pageant, and won the title of Miss La Florida 2017. 
 Simone Mack was a finalist in Elite Model Look Chile 2014. 
 Amelia Herrera was a finalist in Miss World Chile 2017.
 María José Besoain was one of the delegates of the Miss Universo Chile 2012.

References

External links
 Miss Universo Chile Official Facebook

Miss Universo Chile
2017 in Chile
2017 beauty pageants